Dinsmore Aerodrome  is located adjacent to Dinsmore, Saskatchewan, Canada.

See also 
List of airports in Saskatchewan

References

External links
Page about this airport on COPA's Places to Fly airport directory

Registered aerodromes in Saskatchewan